Ot 'n' Sweaty is the fourth album by the American rock band Cactus. It was released in 1972. Original members Jim McCarty and Rusty Day had left the group, so bass guitarist Tim Bogert and drummer Carmine Appice were joined by Werner Fritzschings on guitar, Duane Hitchings on keyboards and Peter French (ex-Leaf Hound and Atomic Rooster) on vocals. This was the band's final album before their long hiatus that lasted until 2006. The first three songs (filled up the first side of the original LP) were recorded live on April 3, 1972, in Puerto Rico at the Mar y Sol Pop Festival, and the rest (the second side of the LP) were recorded in studio (so on the album's front cover is pointed after the band's name: On Stage In Puerto Rico And In The Studio). The pinnacle tracks for this album are "Bad Stuff", "Bringing Me Down", "Bedroom Mazurka", "Telling You" and a live recording of "Let Me Swim", which was a song by the original Cactus on their 1970 debut album[].

Track listing

Personnel
Cactus
 Carmine Appice – drums, backing vocals, percussion
 Tim Bogert – bass, backing vocals
 Werner Fritzschings – guitar
 Peter French – lead and backing vocals
 Duane Hitchings – keyboards, organ, electric and acoustic pianos

Album credits
 Andree Buchler – Re-release coordinator
 Thierry Amsallem – Re-release coordinator
 Michael Delugg – Engineer
 Jimmy Douglass – Engineer
 Geoffrey Haslam – Producer, remixing, mixing
 Joel Kerr – Engineer
 Bernie Kirsh – Assistant engineer
 Claude Nobs – Re-release coordinator
 David Palmer – Engineer
 Buzz Richmond – Assistant engineer
 Jean Ristori – Mastering
 Tom Scott – Engineer
 Ray Thompson – Engineer
 James E. Vickers – Engineer

Charts 

1972 albums
Cactus (American band) albums
Atco Records albums